The Amaranth Wind Farm, also known as the Melancthon EcoPower Centre, is a 199.5 megawatt (MW) wind farm in Amaranth and Melancthon Township, near Shelburne, Ontario. The centre is owned and operated by TransAlta and at the time of opening, was Canada's largest wind energy installation.

Construction of the Melancthon EcoPower Centre began with the 67.5 MW Phase I in 2005 and achieved commercial operation in March 2006. Construction of the 132 MW Phase II of the project began in 2007 and achieved full commercial operation in November 2008.

See also

List of wind farms in Canada
List of offshore wind farms

References

External links
"Where is my Electricity Coming From at this Hour? (if I lived in Ontario)" (Canadian Nuclear Society, with data from IESO)

Wind farms in Ontario
Buildings and structures in Dufferin County